Piazza Barberini is a large piazza in the centro storico or city center of Rome, Italy and situated on the Quirinal Hill. It was created in the 16th century but many of the surrounding buildings have subsequently been rebuilt.

The current appellation was given in 1625 when it was named after the Palazzo Barberini, the substantial Baroque palace built in an elevated position on the south side of the piazza for the Barberini. Originally, there was a large entrance gateway to the palace designed by the Baroque painter and architect Pietro da Cortona on the south east corner of the piazza but this was demolished to make way for the construction of a new road in the 19th century. However, its appearance is known from engravings and early photographs of the piazza.

At the centre of the piazza is the Fontana del Tritone or Triton Fountain (1642–3) sculpted by Bernini. Another fountain, the Fontana delle Api (1644), also by Bernini is in the nearby Via Vittorio Veneto but it has been reconstructed somewhat arbitrarily following its removal from its previous position on the corner of a palace where the Piazza Barberini meets the Via Sistina.  
 
Until the 18th century, unknown human corpses were displayed here for public identification. Between 1632 and 1822 an antique obelisk stood here; it was transferred to Villa Medici.

Modern geography

Today, the piazza is large crossroad for Rome's traffic and, since 1980, has accommodated a station on Line A of the Rome Metro, called Barberini – Fontana di Trevi.  .

References

External links
 Piazza Barberini with a lot of pictures
 Roma Segreta: "Piazza Barberini" (italian)

Barberini
Barberini family
Rome R. II Trevi
Rome R. III Colonna